Nightforce Optics, Inc. is an American manufacturer of high-end telescopic sights, spotting scopes and mounting accessories, based in Lavonia, Georgia with factory headquarters in Orofino, Idaho. Established in 1992, the company is the optic subsidiary of Lightforce Performance Lighting, an Australian manufacturer of specialty lighting products based in Hindmarsh, South Australia.

History 
The company's founder, Ray Dennis, is an Australian dentist whose parents were German immigrants settled in South Australia after the Second World War. At a very early age he participated in rabbit and fox hunting with his grandfather, and became a keen hunter as he grew older. Due to the nocturnal nature of many Australian wild animals, spotlighting is the most common hunting method. At the same time, he also found the popular European scopes on the market were missing the right features needed for his night hunting applications such as parallax adjustment and high magnifications, and the American products often had small objective size and very fine reticles and hence lacking in light-gathering power and reticle clarity.

When going to the 1986 SHOT Show in New Orleans to try market his spotlights, Dennis found a manufacturer in Japan that can produce scopes designed to his suggested specifications, and ordered a batch of 500 units to be made and sold in the Australian market. The sale was a success, and Dennis decided to establish his own company named Lightforce to sell his products, with the intention to also venture into the US market.  The American branch was initially established in Seattle with only two staff members, and primarily focused on marketing spotlighting products as Dennis considered the American optics market was already well-established with little room for a small new competitor like his company. To his surprise, the American consumers responded rather coldly to the spotlights (as night hunting was rare in North America at the time, and spotlighting was outlawed in many states), but very warmly to the scopes.  The company then switched its focus to sell predominantly optics in America.

The company changed its name to Nightforce in the early 1990s after being confronted by a Californian lightbar manufacturer also named Lightforce, who demanded $25,000 for trademark sharing — an amount Dennis found unacceptable.  After that manufacturer later went out of business, the company acquired the legal rights to use the "Lightforce" brand name to its lighting products, and retained the "Nightforce" brand for its sporting optics products as the trademark already established a sizable market following with its 3.5-15× power Varmint scopes.

In 1998, the company moved its operations from Washington to Idaho.  Soon afterwards, the company rolled out the famous NXS series scopes, which was their first standard bearer product suitable for both military and hunting applications, aiming to appeal to top-tier groups (such as the Navy SEALs) within the American armed forces.  Military contracts started to come in in the early 2000s, and the company bidded in the Precision Sniper Rifle program in 2009 but lost out to Schmidt & Bender.  However, in 2010, the company was awarded a $25.8 million firm-fixed-price contract to manufacture scopes for special forces and snipers in the Army, Navy, Air Force and Marine Corps, with accompanying service for spares, repairs and upgrades.

Products

Riflescope 
 ATACR™ ("Advanced Tactical Riflescope") family
 B.E.A.S.T. ("Best Example of Advanced Scope Technology") 5-25×56 F1
 SHV™ ("Shooter Hunter Varminter") family
 Competition™ series
 Precision Benchrest™ series
 NX8™ 1-8×24 F1
 NXS™ ("Nightforce Xtreme Scope") family

Spotting scope  
 TS-80™ Hi-Def™ 20-60×
 TS-82™ Xtreme Hi-Def™ 20-70×

Accessories 
 Scope mount
 Standard Duty series aluminium mounts and bases
 X-Treme Duty series steel/titanium rings, mounts and bases
 Carbon Fiber Tripod
 Nightforce Angle Degree Indicator (with various mounting options)
 Top Ring bubble level
 Power Throw Lever (PTL™)
 Nightforce Tool Kit
 Nightforce Cleaning Kit

References

External links
 Nightforce official website
 Lightforce official website

1992 establishments in Georgia (U.S. state)
Optics manufacturing companies
Manufacturing companies based in Georgia (U.S. state)